Maria Nicole Chappelle-Nadal (born October 3, 1974) is an American politician who served in the Missouri House of Representatives from the 86th district from 2019 to 2021. A Democrat from University City, Missouri, she represented district 14 in the Missouri Senate from 2011 to 2019. She previously served in the Missouri House of Representatives from district 72, a position which she held from 2005 to 2011. In 2010, Chappelle-Nadal was elected to the Missouri Senate to succeed fellow Democrat Rita Heard Days of St. Louis.

As a state senator Chappelle-Nadal was a prominent critic of the Ferguson police shooting of Michael Brown in August 2014.

In August 2017,  Missouri Democrats U.S. Senator Claire McCaskill and Representative William Lacy Clay were among the state and national politicians calling for her resignation after she made a social media comment where she said, "I hope Trump is assassinated", referring to U.S. President Donald Trump. In response to her comments, Senate Democratic Leader Gina Walsh removed her from all Senate committee assignments. On September 13, 2017, Chappelle-Nadal was formally censured by the Missouri State Senate for her comments.

Early life and education
Chappelle-Nadal is a University City native. She received a dual degree in political science and sociology from  Georgia State University. In 2002, Chappelle-Nadal was one of sixteen national fellows chosen by the National Organization for Black Elected Legislative/Women and the Center for American Women in Politics (CAWP) at Rutgers University to attend a national program for women in public policy and politics. She is a former participant in the Sue Shear Institute for Women in Public Life (2004) and the Neighborhood Leadership Academy (2002) at the University of Missouri-St. Louis. Her maternal grandfather was originally from Ponce, Puerto Rico.

Political career

Missouri House of Representatives
Chappelle-Nadal was first elected to the Missouri House of Representatives in 2004, representing District 72. She was re-elected in 2006 and 2008, serving in this office until her successful state senate campaign in 2010. While in office, she served on the Ways and Means, Small Business and Senior Citizen Advocacy Committees.

Missouri Senate
Chappelle-Nadal was first elected state senator of District 14 in 2010, and successfully ran for re-election in 2014. She chose not to run for reelection in 2018 and was succeeded by Democrat Brian Williams, who won a three-way primary and was unopposed in the general election.

Role in filibusters
Chappelle-Nadal is known for filibustering bills.  In February 2012, Chappelle-Nadal led a 14-hour filibuster of a bill that would have weakened existing law preventing discrimination in the workplace. Chappelle-Nadal herself filibustered the bill for 10 hours and 45 minutes of the 14-hour filibuster. The compromise which ended the filibuster "removed language which would have required a judge, not a jury, to review facts in worker discrimination cases." 
In March 2016, she led a 39-hour filibuster of a bill that would have legalized discrimination against gay couples. After passing the 24-hour mark, former Texas State Senator Wendy Davis, known for her own 11-hour filibuster of a bill restricting abortions, tweeted an offer to loan Chappelle-Nadal "a certain pair of shoes for the [filibuster]." In April 2016, Chappelle-Nadal filibustered a bill regarding sales tax by reading "The 50th Law", an autobiography detailing the life and career of rapper 50 Cent. Chappelle-Nadal filibustered the bill because St. Louis County had not agreed to a consent decree proposed by the Department of Justice that was offered to the Ferguson Police Department following the use of tear gas and excessive force against protesters.

Radioactive waste legislation
Chappelle-Nadal has raised awareness of radioactive waste in the St. Louis region. Individuals living near the West Lake landfill and Coldwater Creek have reported a number of health problems, including cancer and autoimmune diseases. In 2012, Chappelle-Nadal wrote an article for Patch Media in which she criticized the Environmental Protection Agency for failing to clean up the waste and acknowledge the threat posed by its existence in the West Lake Landfill. In 2013, Chappelle-Nadal proposed Senate Concurrent Resolution 11 which urged Congress to "transfer authority for the remediation of the West Lake Landfill radioactive waste from the EPA to the Corps of Engineers' Formerly Utilized Sites Remedial Action Program (FUSRAP)." In 2014, Chappelle-Nadal proposed Senate Concurrent Resolution 23, which mirrored SCR 11. In January 2016, Chappelle-Nadal proposed Senate Bill 600 which would have created a buyout program of contaminated homes near the Bridgeton Landfill. In 2017, Chappelle-Nadal proposed Senate Bill 22 which would create a $12 million buyout program that would purchase homes contaminated with radioactive waste within a radius of the Bridgeton Landfills. On April 12, 2017, Senate Bill 22 was approved by the Missouri Senate and sent to the Missouri House of Representatives.

Town hall meetings
On September 6, 2015, Chappelle-Nadal held her first town hall meeting in St. Louis regarding radioactive waste resulting from processing uranium ore for the Manhattan Project during World War II. Chappelle-Nadal has since held 70 town hall meetings and aims to hold a total of 100 town hall meetings by the end of 2017. Chappelle-Nadal believes that part of the solution is to convene a congressional investigatory panel focusing on the EPA's inaction on legacy nuclear waste contamination in the St. Louis region.

Trump assassination social media post
On August 17, 2017, in response to the Unite the Right rally in Charlottesville, Virginia, Chappelle-Nadal replied to a comment on one of her Facebook posts, writing "I hope Trump is assassinated!" She then deleted the comment, though it quickly spread online. The U.S. Secret Service said it was investigating her comment. Chappelle-Nadal later told KMOV, "No, I don't want to see anyone assassinated, but he should not be president, he should be impeached." She later issued a formal apology for her comments.

Missouri U.S. Senator Claire McCaskill, Congressman Lacy Clay, and Missouri Senate Minority Leader Gina Walsh were among the state and national Democrats calling for her resignation.  The St. Louis Post-Dispatch has called for her resignation. In response to Chappelle-Nadal's social media post State Representative Joshua Peters sent a letter to the chairman of the Rules, Joint Rules, Resolutions and Ethics Committee, requesting that a special committee consider Chappelle-Nadal's "censure or removal" from office.  Missouri Lt. Governor Mike Parson's office said he would call for Chappelle-Nadal's expulsion from office under Article III, Section 18 of the Missouri Constitution, which allows the Missouri Senate to expel a member with a two-thirds vote. On August 22, Senate Democratic Caucus Leader, Senator Gina Walsh, removed Chappelle-Nadal from all Senate committee assignments due to her comments. On September 13, 2017, the Missouri State Senate publicly condemned Chappelle-Nadal for her comments, by a vote of 28–2.

Other roles

Chappelle-Nadal is a former member of the Democratic National Committee, serving from 2005 to 2009. Chappelle-Nadal worked as director of communications for Lt. Governor Joe Maxwell in 2010. She also served as the director of boards and commissions, later becoming Missouri's senior advocate. Legislation associated with her work in these roles includes the Senior Care and Protection Act of 2003, and the Missouri Senior Rx Generic Drug Rebate. In addition, Chappelle-Nadal was one of Missouri's superdelegates to the 2008 Democratic National Convention in Denver, Colorado. Chappelle-Nadal currently serves as director on the University City School Board.

Role in Ferguson unrest

Chappelle-Nadal took part in the protests over the shooting of Michael Brown in Ferguson, Missouri in August 2014. She criticized the police response to the civil unrest and the way the crisis was handled within the community. During the protests, Chappelle-Nadal was among the protesters who were tear-gassed by law enforcement officials.

Chappelle-Nadal asserted that institutional inequality is a major issue underpinning the unrest in Ferguson, contributing to tensions between police and an angered community: "I have to tell you that there has been systematic racism, institutionally in state government for decades, including my own state party," she said. "People are angry, and they are hurt, and they're trying to figure out: how are they going to receive justice?" Chappelle-Nadal proposed legislation in 2015 to re-examine policies related to use of deadly force and proper legal procedures following officer-involved deaths.

During the unrest, Chappelle-Nadal sent several expletive-laden tweets to then Governor Jay Nixon criticizing him for his response to the protests and riots.

References

External links
Missouri House of Representatives - Maria Chappelle-Nadal official MO House website
Project Vote Smart - Maria N. Chappelle-Nadal (MO) profile
Follow the Money - Maria Chappelle-Nadal
2006 2004 campaign contributions

1974 births
21st-century American politicians
21st-century American women politicians
African-American state legislators in Missouri
Georgia State University alumni
Democratic Party members of the Missouri House of Representatives
Living people
Politicians from St. Louis County, Missouri
Shooting of Michael Brown
Women state legislators in Missouri
Political controversies in the United States
21st-century African-American women
21st-century African-American politicians
20th-century African-American people
20th-century African-American women